A constitutional referendum was held in Russia on 12 December 1993. The new constitution was approved by 58.4% of voters, and came into force on 25 December.

Background
Since 1992, President Boris Yeltsin had been arguing that the 1978 constitution was obsolete and needed replacing. He called for a new constitution which would grant more powers to the President. However, two competing drafts of a new constitution were drawn up by the government and the Congress of People's Deputies. Failure of the two groups to reach a compromise led to Yeltsin dissolving the Congress of People's Deputies in September 1993, leading to a constitutional crisis.

Yeltsin then called a Constitutional Assembly that was sympathetic to his views. The Assembly subsequently drafted a constitution that provided for a strong presidency, and was published on 11 November.

Name
This referendum was officially named "nationwide voting" in documents.

Translated:

Results

Voter turnout was officially reported as 54.4%, over the 50% threshold required to validate the referendum. However, doubts remained over the accuracy of the turnout figure, exacerbated by the quick destruction of ballots and area tallies.

By region

References

Referendums in Russia
1993 referendums
1993 in Russia
1993 elections in Russia
Constitutional referendums
December 1993 events in Russia
1993 Russian constitutional crisis